Henry "Harry" Curran (born 9 October 1966 in Glasgow) is a Scottish former professional footballer who played in midfield for a number of Scottish clubs.

Honours

St Johnstone

Scottish Football League First Division: 1
 1989–90

References

External links

1966 births
Footballers from Glasgow
Living people
Scottish footballers
Dumbarton F.C. players
Dundee United F.C. players
St Johnstone F.C. players
Partick Thistle F.C. players
Dunfermline Athletic F.C. players
Greenock Morton F.C. players
Alloa Athletic F.C. players
Stranraer F.C. players
Scottish Football League players
Association football midfielders